Micropyle may refer to:
 Micropyle (botany) a minute opening in the integument of an ovule of a seed plant.
 Micropyle (zoology), a differentiated area of surface in an egg, through which a sperm enters